Forth is the fourth and final studio album by the English alternative rock band the Verve before their third break up in 2009. It was released internationally on 25 August 2008 on EMI and a day later in North America on the On Your Own label. The band reformed in 2007, having broken up in 1999. Forth was their first album of new material since their 1997 album Urban Hymns and their first since 1995's A Northern Soul to feature the original line-up without second guitarist and keyboardist Simon Tong. It is also the second album to feature the Urban Hymns and Ashcroft's solo album producer Chris Potter.

The album's first single, "Love Is Noise", received its first airplay on BBC Radio 1 on 23 June 2008. The song reached number 4 on the UK Singles Chart and became a summer hit in Europe. The band also released a non-album track, "Mover", as a free download a week later.

Background
The band recorded new songs in Richmond between 2007 and 2008. Most of the backing tracks were done before touring the UK in November and December. Then, recording continued between February and the start of their summer dates in April and some final work was done after the mini US-tour done between April and May before their summer festival appearances in Europe and Japan. Jonathan Cohen of Billboard states that Forth is "[A] bracing blend of the experimentalism of the group's early work and the more structured songwriting of its last two efforts."

"Sit and Wonder" and "Love Is Noise" have been played live during the band's festival appearances, including the Coachella Valley Music and Arts Festival in April 2008; "Rather Be" also received select live airings throughout the summer, notably as part of the band's headlining set at the V Festival in August 2008. "I See Houses" was played live once, at the Eden Project in Cornwall in August 2008.

Release and reception

Like The Verve's previous studio album Urban Hymns, Forth peaked on the UK Albums Chart at number one, and at number 23 on the US Billboard 200. Forth was certified gold by the British Phonographic Industry. The album sold about 21,000 copies in its first week of release in the US, and  has sold about 53,000 copies in the US.

Forth received generally positive reviews from music critics. At Metacritic, which assigns a normalized rating out of 100 to reviews from mainstream critics, the album received an average score of 71, based on 28 reviews, indicating "generally favorable reviews."

Forth was named No. 47 in Qs "50 Best Albums of the Year" for 2008  and No.26  in NME's "Best Albums of 2008" list.

Track listing
All songs written by the Verve, except where noted.Notes Due to the addition of two tracks before "Appalachian Springs" on the LP and Japanese versions, the song "Appalachian Springs" becomes track 12.

Digital downloads
"The Thaw Session" - 14:09 ( It was released exclusively as a free download by the band through the NME website on 22 October 2007) 
"Mover" - 3:55 (2008 Version / It was available at www.theverve.tv for one week only) 
"Let the Damage Begin" – 4:09 (Amazon.com exclusive bonus track – live version from 2007 originally released as a B-side to "Love Is Noise")

B-sides
"Chic Dub" - 6:12 ("Love Is Noise" B-side)
"Major Force" - 5:53 (Rather Be 7" Vinyl #1) 
"All Night Long" - 7:26 (Rather Be - 7" Vinyl #2)

Unofficially released songs
"Blue Pacific Ocean" - 6:20 (Leaked the 18-05-08) 
"Mona Lisa" - 3:59 (It was going to be included in the album and was also proposed as the first single, according to Nick McCabe) [Richard Ashcroft]
"Ain't The Future A Trip" ?:?? (This song was temporarily leaked on a forum of fans)

Special edition DVD
 Space & Time: The Verve Documentary
 The Verve: Live at Coachella, April 2008
"Sonnet"
"This Is Music"
"The Rolling People"
"Lucky Man"
"Love Is Noise"

PersonnelThe VerveRichard Ashcroft – vocals, acoustic guitars, keyboards
Nick McCabe – lead guitar, keyboards, vibraphone, autoharp
Simon Jones – bass guitar
Peter Salisbury – drums, percussionAdditional personnel'
Davide Rossi – string arrangements, violins (tracks 1, 2, 3, 4, 6 and 8)
The Verve – producer
Cameron Jenkins – mixing, recording
Chris Potter – producer, mixing, recording (tracks 1, 2, 3, 5, 6, 8 and 10)
Tim Bran – producer, mixing (tracks 3, 4, 5, 6, 7, 9 and 10)
Jazz Summers and Tim Parry for The Big Life Music Company – management
Dean Chalkley – portrait photography
Studio Fury – design & art direction

Charts

Weekly charts

Year-end charts

Certifications

}

Release history

References

External links

Forth at YouTube (streamed copy where licensed)

2008 albums
The Verve albums
Albums produced by Chris Potter (record producer)
Parlophone albums